Gerardo Daniel Martínez (born 11 April 1991) is an Argentine professional footballer who plays as a midfielder.

References
 
 

1991 births
Living people
Argentine footballers
Association football midfielders
Chilean Primera División players
Ecuadorian Serie A players
Deportivo Morón footballers
Cobresal footballers
Manta F.C. footballers
Argentine expatriate footballers
Argentine expatriate sportspeople in Chile
Expatriate footballers in Chile
Argentine expatriate sportspeople in Ecuador
Expatriate footballers in Ecuador
People from Moreno Partido
Sportspeople from Buenos Aires Province